Conashaugh, Pennsylvania is a ghost town in Delaware Township, Pike County, Pennsylvania between Dingmans Ferry, Pennsylvania, Milford, Pennsylvania and Birchwood Lakes, Pennsylvania. It is along the Delaware River bordering New Jersey and is now a part of the Delaware Water Gap National Recreation Area. It was originally occupied by American Civil War deserters, and is now considered a ghost town due to the decline of its original population.

History 
A ghost town is a town that was once popular because of a natural resource or historical event but has died down due to depletion of that source.  Conashaugh was settled by American Civil War deserters. Desertion (soldiers leaving the forces without permission from a standing officer) was a major issue in the Civil War, and many deserters resided in Conashaugh. There is little research and historical evidence in Conashaugh to document these deserters, or of other historical events in the town.

Current status 
Conashaugh is currently a part of the Delaware River Water Gap National Recreation Area, managed by the National Park Service. It includes a large area of land surrounding the Delaware River.

See also

 Conashaugh Lakes, Pennsylvania

References

Further reading
 “Land Records Overview”. Pennsylvania Historical and Museum Commission. State of Pennsylvania Government. Web. 13 Sept 2017. (Pennsylvania land records)
 “Pennsylvania State Archives”. ARIAS. Web. 12 September 2017. (May hold information on former soldiers in the area during the time)
 Lonn, Ella. "Desertion During The Civil War".  Gloucester, Massachusetts. University of Nebraska Press. 1998. Print. (On desertion and the social impacts it has left on soldiers and armies)
 Costa, D.L., Kahn, M.E. “Deserters, Social Norms, and Migration, The Journal of Law and Economics. Vol 50. 2. (2007): 323-353. Arcadia University JSTOR Database. Web. 12 September 2017. (How deserters came to choose Conashaugh as a landing space)
Taylor, H. The Illustrated Delaware River: The History of a Great American River. 2015. Print. (Includes photographs of the area and river)

Ghost towns in Pennsylvania
Geography of Pike County, Pennsylvania